Coca Andronescu (3 July 1932 – 5 August 1998) was a Romanian stage, television and film actress.

Selected filmography
 Telegrame (1960)
  (1960)
  (1961)
  (1964)
 Titanic Waltz (1964)
  (1967)
  (1975)
  (1976)
  (1976)
  (1977)
  (1978)
  (1979)
  (1979)
  (1981)
  (1985)
 Colierul de turcoaze (1986)
 Cuibul de viespi (1986)
  (1988)

References

Bibliography 
 Peter Cowie & Derek Elley. World Filmography: 1967. Fairleigh Dickinson University Press, 1977.

External links 
 

1932 births
1998 deaths
Romanian film actresses
Romanian stage actresses
Romanian television actresses
People from Buzău County
Recipients of the Order of Cultural Merit (Romania)